Saudi TV Channel 2 (KSA 2), or as of 2014 known as Saudi 2 was the English news and entertainment TV channel of Saudi Arabia.

Established in 1983, the channel produces programmes focusing on cultural, political, and economic issues aimed at expatriates living in Saudi Arabia. Following its conversion to a 24-hour channel it expanded its broadcasting to Europe and North America in the middle of 2007 and now employs a large network of news correspondents based in the Middle East, the United Kingdom and the United States.

Despite being the only English-language public channel for Saudi Arabian expatriates, the Minister of Culture and Information Dr. Awwad Bin Saleh Al-Awwad has suspended the channel's transmission in December 2017 as part of a plan to suit the Saudi Vision 2030.

Former programming

Foreign

Cartoons
The Ruff and Reddy Show
Mr. Bogus
Danger Mouse
Bouli
The Telebugs
Hammerman
Widget
Superman
Chip 'n Dale Rescue Rangers
Top Cat
Yakky Doodle
Wowser
Rub-a-Dub-Dub
Diplodos
Goofy
My Little Pony
Seabert
Bionic Six
My Pet Monster
Dexter's Laboratory
The Pink Panther Show
Dastardly and Muttley in Their Flying Machines
Huckleberry Hound
Tom & Jerry Kids
Adventures of Pow Wow
Sniffles
Amigo and Friends
Moomin
Popples
Casper and Friends
The Abbott and Costello Cartoon Show
Rupert
Pluto
The Flintstones
Sylvanian Families
Pingu
The Jetsons
M.A.S.K.
Harlem Globetrotters
The Adventures of Tintin
Snooper and Blabber
Hurricanes
Glo Friends
Foofur
Beany and Cecil
The Road Runner Show
Quick Draw McGraw
Punkin' Puss & Mushmouse
Loopy de Loop
The Adventures of Super Mario Bros. 3
Yogi Bear
Teenage Mutant Ninja Turtles
Plonsters
The Adventures of Teddy Ruxpin
Simon in the Land of Chalk Drawings
The Shoe People
Tiny Toon Adventures
Dinky Di's
Looney Tunes
Ricochet Rabbit & Droop-a-Long
Scooby-Doo, Where Are You!
Yo, Yogi!
The Mumbly Cartoon Show
The Pink Panther
The Centurions
Snorks
Dink, the Little Dinosaur
Adventures of Sonic the Hedgehog
The All-New Popeye Show
Spider-Man
Casper the Friendly Ghost
The Teddy Bear Show
Lippy the Lion and Hardy Har Har
Where on Earth Is Carmen Sandiego?
The New Three Stooges
Popeye and Son
Deputy Dawg
Bozo: The World's Most Famous Clown
Inspector Gadget
Kimba the White Lion
Bucky and Pepito
Merrie Melodies
DuckTales
Touché Turtle and Dum Dum
Pixie and Dixie and Mr. Jinks
Thunderbirds 2086
The Beary Family
Double Dragon
Dennis the Menace
Young Samson & Goliath
MoonDreamers
Peter Potamus
Fables of the Green Forest
Bolek and Lolek
Oggy and the Cockroaches
Tom and Jerry
The Three Mouseketeers
Spiral Zone
Droopy
Miaunel and Bălănel
Yippee, Yappee and Yahooey
Terrytoons
Woody Woodpecker
Mole
Fleischer Cartoons
The Woody Woodpecker Show
Denver, the Last Dinosaur
Hickory, Dickory, and Doc
Inspector Willoughby
Wally Gator
The New Adventures of Mighty Mouse and Heckle & Jeckle
Bucky O'Hare and the Toad Wars
Laurel and Hardy
Spirou
The Tom and Jerry Show
Heroes on Hot Wheels
Potsworth & Co
The Undersea Adventures of Captain Nemo
Little Lulu
Demetan Croaker, The Boy Frog
Augie Doggie and Doggie Daddy
Snagglepuss
The Ant and the Aardvark
The Bugs Bunny Show
Mighty Mouse
Potato Head Kids
The Hillbilly Bears
Zoo Olympics
Tom of T.H.U.M.B.
Battle of the Planets
The Inspector
My Little Pony Tales
Little Bear
Donald Duck
Chilly Willy
Barney Bear
The Berenstain Bears
Swifty and Shorty
Popeye the Sailor Man
Andy Panda
The Tijuana Toads
Space Ghost
Mighty Man and Yukk
The Smurfs
Precious Pupp
Mr. Magoo
Here Comes the Grump
Fat Albert and the Cosby Kids
Atom Ant
The Houndcats
Zoo Cup
Phantom 2040
The Adventures of Rocky and Bullwinkle and Friends
Hokey Wolf
Breezly and Sneezly
The Great Grape Ape Show
Rescue Heroes
Avengers Assemble
Guardians of the Galaxy
Ultimate Spider-Man
Hulk and the Agents of S.M.A.S.H.

Children's
You Can't Do That on Television
3-2-1 Contact
Zoom
The Electric Company
Beakman's World
Land of the Lost
Square One Television
Today's Special
The Dr. Fad Show
Sesame Street
Mike and Angelo
EMU-TV
The Girl from Tomorrow
Bananas in Pyjamas
Fraggle Rock
Size Small
Captain Power and the Soldiers of the Future
The Secret World of Alex Mack
Road to Avonlea
My Secret Identity
Metal Mickey
Wonder Why?
Spatz
Knightmare
Mr. Dressup
Lassie
Mr. Wizard's World
Under the Umbrella Tree
The Banana Splits
Rainbow
Curiocity
Are You Afraid of the Dark?
Jim Henson's Mother Goose Stories
The Voyage of the Mimi
Mirror, Mirror
The Curiosity Show
Picture Pages

Soap Opera
Hotel

Cooking
Yan Can Cook

Comedy
Maniac Mansion
Too Close for Comfort
Welcome Back, Kotter
Growing Pains
Full House
Out of This World
Hey Dad..!
Charles in Charge
ALF
Mr. Belvedere
TV's Bloopers and Practical Jokes
Murphy Brown
Kate & Allie
Diff'rent Strokes
America's Funniest Home Videos
Good Times
Small Wonder
Punky Brewster
Night Court
Mr. Bean
You Can't Take It with You
Major Dad
Family Matters
What's Happening!!
The Three Stooges
Perfect Strangers
Never the Twain
Chance in a Million
Benson
Harry and the Hendersons
McHale's Navy
The Jeffersons
Valerie
Head of the Class
Silver Spoons
Mind Your Language
Laurel and Hardy
Home Improvement
Coach
Frasier
America's Funniest People
My Mother the Car

Drama
Law & Order
Misfits of Science
The A-Team
Water Rats
Bergerac
Simon & Simon
Doogie Howser, M.D.
The Bionic Woman
The Equalizer
Sergeant Preston of the Yukon
The Life and Times of Grizzly Adams
Magnum, P.I.
Five Mile Creek
CHiPS
Barnaby Jones
African Skies
Emily of New Moon
Street Hawk
The Knock
Miami Vice
L.A. Heat
Our House
A Year in the Life
Bordertown
Cop Shop
Matlock
RoboCop: The Series
Zorro
Tour of Duty
Sirens
Kung Fu
Dr. Quinn, Medicine Woman
MacGyver
Blue Heelers
Oshin
Callan
Knight Rider
Simon & Simon
Little House on the Prairie
The Flying Doctors
Barnaby Jones
Manimal
The Man from Snowy River
E.N.G.
Superboy
Centennial
All The Rivers Run II
Daktari
Sherlock Holmes
Highlander: The Series
A Sucessora
Tarzan

Magazine
Living Tomorrow

Documentary
Rescue 911
Tomorrow's World
Ripley's Believe It or Not!
Lorne Greene's New Wilderness
The World About Us
Life After People

Reality
That's Incredible!
Candid Camera

Game shows
Treasure Hunt
Interceptor
You've Been Framed!
Telematch
Win, Lose or Draw
Give Us a Clue
Lingo
The Crystal Maze
Take Your Pick!

Variety
The Mickey Mouse Club

Anthology
The Wonderful World of Disney

Education
Beyond 2000
Wonderstruck
Encyclopedia Britannica

Magic
The Paul Daniels Magic Show

Sports
Trans World Sport
Gillette World Sport Special

References

External links

Saudi 2 live
Saudi TV Channel 2 at LyngSat)

Television stations in Saudi Arabia
Television channels and stations established in 1983
English-language television stations
Television channels and stations disestablished in 2017
2017 disestablishments in Saudi Arabia